Republic of the Congo competed at the 2019 African Games held from 19 to 31 August 2019 in Rabat, Morocco. In total, athletes representing the country won one silver medal and three bronze medals and the country finished in 31st place in the medal table, shared with Zimbabwe.

Medal summary

Medal table

|  style="text-align:left; width:78%; vertical-align:top;"|

|  style="text-align:left; width:22%; vertical-align:top;"|

Athletics 

Ten athletes represented Republic of the Congo in athletics.

Romeo Manzila Mahambou competed in the men's 100 metres and he did not advance to the semifinals.

Natacha Ngoye Akamabi competed in the women's 100 metres and women's 200 metres events. She finished in 5th place in the final of the 100 metres event and also in 5th place in the final of the 200 metres event.

Marcelle Bouele Bondo competed in the women's 400 metres event. She was also scheduled to compete in the women's 100 metres event but she did not start.

Gymnastics 

Republic of the Congo competed in gymnastics.

Karate 

Republic of the Congo competed in karate and the country finished in 6th place in the karate medal table. Two medals were won: the silver medal in the women's Kumite team event and Diabate Pembe Fatoumata won the bronze medal in the women's Kumite -50 kg event.

Swimming 

Dienov Andres Koka and Bellore Sangala competed in swimming.

Men

Women

Table tennis 

Republic of the Congo competed in table tennis and won the bronze medal in the men's team tournament.

Taekwondo 

Ebouenet Seno Pissoubi Geoffrey (Men's -58 kg event), Matadi Nkoy Rosny (Men's -63 kg event) and Ngouabi-matingou Emelia R (Women's +73 kg event) competed in Taekwondo.

Wrestling 

Two athletes represented Republic of the Congo in wrestling.

Mbouma Mandzo Noelle Therencia competed in the Women's Freestyle -57 kg event and she won the bronze medal. Mambou Arnaud competed in the Men's Freestyle -74 kg event.

References 

Nations at the 2019 African Games
2019
African Games